Kent Plateau is an ice-covered plateau,  long and  wide, extending northward from Mount Egerton and Kiwi Pass to the vicinity of Mount Hamilton, in the Churchill Mountains of Antarctica. It was named by the Advisory Committee on Antarctic Names for Commander Donald F. Kent, U.S. Navy, logistics officer to Admiral Dufek at the outset of U.S. Navy Operation Deep Freeze I, 1955–56.

References

Plateaus of Oates Land